Pinyan is a surname and occasionally a given name. 

Notable people with the surname include:

 Kenneth Pinyan (19602005), American engineer; died as a result of the Enumclaw horse sex case
 Zion Pinyan (born 1951), Israeli politician, member of the Knesset for Likud

People with the given name Pinyan include:

 Liu Pinyan (born 1988), Taiwanese musician, member of Mandopop girl group Sweety

See also 

 Kenneth Pinyan
 Pinyin
 Enumclaw horse sex case